Bakari Bata (also known as Bakiri Bata) is a village in the commune of Belel in the Adamawa Region of Cameroon.

Population 
In 1967, the settlement contained 681 inhabitants, mostly Fula people In the 2005 census, 879 people were counted there.

Infrastructure 
There is a public school in Bakari Bata.

References

Bibliography
 Jean Boutrais, 1993, Peuples et cultures de l'Adamaoua (Cameroun) : actes du colloque de Ngaoundéré du 14 au 16 janvier 1992, Paris : Éd. de l'ORSTOM u.a.
 Dictionnaire des villages de l'Adamaoua, ONAREST, Yaoundé, October 1974, 133 p.

External links
 Belel , on the website Communes et villes unies du Cameroun (CVUC)
 Climat : Bakari Bata (climate-data.org)

Populated places in Adamawa Region